The U-17 Africa Cup of Nations also called TotalEnergies U-17 Africa Cup of Nations for sponsoring reason (previously known as the African U-17 Championship) is a bi-annual football competition organised by the sport's African governing body, CAF. The competition has been held since 1995. Between 1985 and 1993 only qualifying competitions for the FIFA U-17 World Cup were played.

History

After FIFA World Cup qualifying tournaments from 1985 to 1993, the first African championship edition started on 1995. On 6 August 2015, the CAF Executive Committee decided to change the name of the tournament from the African U-17 Championship to the U-17 Africa Cup of Nations, similar to the senior's version, Africa Cup of Nations.

In July 2016, Total has secured an eight-year sponsorship package from the Confederation of African Football (CAF) to support 10 of its principal competitions, including the U-17 Africa Cup of Nations Champions, renamed Total U-17 Africa Cup of Nations.

Results

African U-16 Qualifying for World Cup

African U-17 Qualifying for World Cup

African U-17 Championship

Africa U-17 Cup of Nations

Total Wins

* = As hosts

Note: no fourth-place finish in 2001 due to Guinea's disqualification.

Participating nations

Legend

 – Champions
 – Runners-up
 – Third place
 – Fourth place
GS – Group stage
q – Qualified for upcoming tournament
 — Hosts
 ×  – Did not enter
 •  – Did not qualify
 ×  – Withdrew before qualification/Banned
 — Withdrew after qualification
 — Disqualified after qualification

Men's U-17 World Cup Qualifiers
Legend
1st – Champions
2nd – Runners-up
3rd – Third place
4th – Fourth place
QF – Quarterfinals
R2 – Round 2
R1 – Round 1
     – Hosts
q – Qualified for upcoming tournament

See also
 Africa Cup of Nations
 Africa U-23 Cup of Nations
 Africa U-20 Cup of Nations
 FIFA U-17 World Cup

References

Notes

External links
African U-17 Championship - cafonline.com
African U-17 Championship - rsssf.com

 
U-17 Cup of Nations
U-17 Cup of Nations
Under-17 association football